The Department of Justice is a department of the Government of Ireland. It is led by the Minister for Justice. The department's mission is to maintain and enhance community security and to promote a fairer society in Ireland.

Departmental team
Minister for Justice: Simon Harris, TD
Minister of State for Youth Justice and Law Reform: James Browne, TD
Secretary General of the Department: Oonagh McPhillips

Overview
The mission of the Department of Justice is to maintain and enhance community security through the development of a range of policies and high-quality services which underpin:

The protection and assertion of human rights and fundamental freedoms consistent with the common good
The security of the State
An effective and balanced approach to tackling crime

In July 2014 the department embarked on a comprehensive programme of change, including the recruitment of a new secretary-general following an independent review.

The official headquarters and ministerial offices of the department are on St Stephen's Green, Dublin.

Responsibilities
The department's main areas of responsibility include:

Implementing government policy on crime and protecting the security of the State (National Security Committee).
Providing policy advice in relation to the criminal justice system (Garda Síochána, the Courts, Prisons and Probation and Welfare Services) and supporting the operation of this system. 
Continuing reform of criminal law and certain areas of civil law. 
Playing a central part in the implementation of core elements in the Good Friday Agreement. 
Co-operating in relevant EU and international matters and promoting the Republic of Ireland's interests within the associated areas of responsibility. 
Implementing the Government's asylum strategy and further developing national immigration policy.

Executive agencies
The department has executive agencies, which legally are integral parts of the department but which are managed separately:
Irish Naturalisation and Immigration Service
Forensic Science Ireland
The Probation Service
Irish Prison Service

Affiliated bodies
Among the state agencies and other bodies affiliated to the department in some way are:

Garda Síochána
Courts Service of Ireland
Garda Síochána Ombudsman Commission (GSOC)
Garda Síochána Inspectorate
Legal Aid Board
State Pathologist's Office
National Disability Authority (NDA)
Office of the Data Protection Commissioner
Irish Film Classification Office (Ifco)
International Protection Office
International Protection Appeals Tribunal
Private Security Authority

No state-sponsored bodies report to the department.

History
In the revolutionary period, the office was known as the Ministry of Home Affairs. The Ministers and Secretaries Act 1924, passed soon after the establishment of the Irish Free State in 1922, provided it with a statutory basis and renamed it as the Department of Justice. This act provided it with:

The schedule assigned it with the following bodies:
All Courts of Justice and the Offices thereof save in so far as the same are reserved to the Executive Council or are excepted from the authority of the Executive Council or of an Executive Minister.
Police.
The General Prisons Board for Ireland and all Prisons.
The Registrar of District Court Clerks.
The Public Record Office.
The Registry of Deeds.
The Land Registry.
The Commissioners of Charitable Donations and Bequests for Ireland.

Alteration of name and transfer of functions
The name and functions of the department have changed by means of statutory instruments.

References

External links
Department of Justice
Structure of the Department
Spending by the Department

 
Justice
Ireland, Justice
1919 establishments in Ireland